Lawrence Olawumi Ayo  was elected Senator for the Ondo North constituency of Ondo State, Nigeria at the start of the Nigerian Fourth Republic, running on the Alliance for Democracy (AD) platform. He took office on 29 May 1999.

Ayo was born in Owo, in Ondo State.
After taking his seat in the Senate, he was appointed to the Senate Committee on Ethics and Privileges.
He was appointed to an ad hoc Senate committee to investigate budgetary and constitutional breaches by President Olusegun Obasanjo, but in October 2002 was among committee members who refused to sign the final report since they had not been invited to participate in its preparation.

References

Members of the Senate (Nigeria)
Living people
People from Owo
Alliance for Democracy (Nigeria) politicians
20th-century Nigerian politicians
21st-century Nigerian politicians
Year of birth missing (living people)